Karel Novy or Karel Nový may refer to:
Karel Novy (swimmer), Swiss swimmer
Karel Nový (writer), Czech writer